Of Stars and Men is a 1964 animated film from the Hubley family of animators, based on the 1959 book of the same name by astronomer Harlow Shapley, who also narrates. Made in the style of a documentary, it tells of humankind's quest (in the form of a child) to find its place in the universe, through themes such as outer space, physical matter, the meaning of life and the periodic table. There are no character voices; instead, they "talk" through their actions. It has been cited as an example of an "animated documentary".

When it was finished, the film was first screened during a conference at MIT's Visual Department. The film's public premiere was on April 28, 1964 at New York's Beekman Theater, along with a collection of Hubley/U.P.A. shorts (Moonbird and Gerald McBoing-Boing among them) which preceded its showing.  The critical reception was uniformly positive.

Its genre was a matter of contention among festival curators. At the Venice Film Festival, Of Stars and Men was placed in the live-action feature category, while at the San Francisco Film Festival, it competed in the documentary category and won an award.

Of Stars and Men received a VHS release from Buena Vista Home Video in July 1990, and had its DVD debut from Image Entertainment nine years later, as part of a compilation of Hubley productions.

See also
List of American films of 1964
The Cosmic Eye, a 1987 film from the Hubleys.
List of animated feature-length films

References

Beck, Jerry (2005), pp. 181–2. The Animated Movie Guide. . Chicago Reader Press. Accessed May 23, 2007.

External links

PBS' Independent Spirits page about the Hubleys (includes clip from the film; RealPlayer required to watch)
TV Guide review
Harvard Square Library's full text scan of Shapeley's original book.

1959 books
1964 animated films
1964 films
1960s American animated films
American animated documentary films
Documentary films about outer space
Films directed by John Hubley
1960s English-language films
American short documentary films